Uranophane (Ca(UO2)2(SiO3OH)2·5H2O), also known as uranotile, is a rare calcium uranium silicate hydrate mineral that forms from the oxidation of other uranium-bearing minerals. It has a yellow color and is radioactive.

Alice Mary Weeks, and Mary E. Thompson of the United States Geological Survey, identified uranophane in 1953.

Classic samples have been produced at Madawaska Mine near Bancroft, Ontario.

References

Calcium minerals
Uranium(VI) minerals
Nesosilicates
Monoclinic minerals
Minerals in space group 4
Luminescent minerals